The Jinyou-class oil tanker is a class of Chinese tanker ship that is in service with People's Liberation Army Navy (PLAN). A total of three units were built by Japanese Kanashashi Shipyard and entered service with PLAN between 1989 – 1990.  These unarmed tankers were upgraded with Chinese radars after delivery, but remain unarmed. One unit was subsequently converted to water tanker (AWT) and remains in active service in mid 2010s, but it is unclear which one of the three oilers the water tanker was converted from. Specification:
Displacement (t): 4800
Length (m): 99
Width (m): 31.8
Draft (m): 5.7
Speed (kn): 15
Endurance: 4000 nmi @ 9 kn
Propulsion: 3000 hp SEMT-Pielstick 8PC2.2L diesel x 1
Armament: None
Radar: 1 Type 756 navigational radar
Crew: 40
Oil tanker version originally went into service:

Water tanker version converted from one of the original oilers:

References

Auxiliary ships of the People's Liberation Army Navy
Auxiliary transport ship classes